Nordin may refer to
 Nordin, New Brunswick, a small community in Canada
Nordin (surname)
Nordin (given name)